The Maiden of the North is an opera in three acts written in 1898 by the Finnish composer Oskar Merikanto. The piece was a collaboration with the Finnish author , the Finnish-language libretto of whom was based on a script by the Finnish opera singer Lorenz Nikolai Achté. The opera tells a story from The Kalevala, Finland's national epic, in which the old wizard Väinämöinen and the blacksmith Ilmarinen, as rival suitors, vie for the hand of the beautiful Maiden of Pohjola; she is the daughter of Louhi, the villainous Queen of the Northland. Although rarely performed, The Maiden of the North retains a degree of historical significance as the first Finnish-language opera.

Composition
Merikanto wrote The Maiden of the North in response to an 1898 advertisement by the Finnish Literature Society, which was holding a contest for a Finnish-language opera about Finnish mythology or history. (A first competition launched in 1891 had received no submissions.) At the time, all extant operas by Finnish composers—for example, Fredrik Pacius's King Charles's Hunt (1852) and Jean Sibelius's The Maiden in the Tower (1896)—had been written to Swedish-language libretti. In March 1899, Merikanto won the competition by default: his The Maiden of the North was the only submission. The awards jury, which included such Helsinki luminaries as Kaarlo Bergbom, Arvid Genetz, Robert Kajanus, and Sibelius, was "extremely critical" of Merikanto's music, arguing that it was "simple"; but because Merikanto had met the parameters of the contest to create a national opera, the awards jury had little choice but to approve his entry. Nevertheless, the jury refused to stage The Maiden of the North, even though Bergbom's Finnish Theatre would have been an obvious venue to premiere the work.

Premiere
The Maiden of the North waited a decade for its first performance, which occurred in the Vyborg Theatre at the 1908 Vyborg (Viipuri) Song Festival. Merikanto conducted the town orchestra, which had to be reinforced by 35 musicians from the Helsinki Orchestral Society, and an amateur chorus comprising local singers and students from the Vyborg Church Music School.  The cast included some of Finland's leading soloists, who created the following roles:

Notes, references, and sources
Notes

References

Sources

Operas
1898 operas
Finnish-language operas
Operas by Oskar Merikanto